The Biber is a right tributary of the Danube in Bavaria, Germany. The source of the Biber is in the south of the hamlet Matzenhofen in Unterroth.

First the Biber crosses the forest of Oberroth. Then the river flows west along the monastery of Roggenburg. Afterwards the river flows through several hamlets and the forest Auwald, into the Danube.

See also
List of rivers of Bavaria

References

Rivers of Bavaria
Bodies of water of Günzburg (district)
Rivers of Germany